Burgmeier is a surname. Notable people with the surname include:

Franz Burgmeier (born 1982), Liechtensteiner footballer and brother of Patrick Burgmeier
John Burgmeier (born 1974), American voice actor and script writer
Patrick Burgmeier (born 1980), Liechtensteiner footballer and brother of Franz Burgmeier
Tom Burgmeier (born 1943), American Major League Baseball relief pitcher